Yellow mustard refers to:

 the condiment American yellow mustard
 the plant white mustard (Sinapis alba)
 the North American plant Guillenia flavescens
 Mustard White butterfly Pieris oleracea

See also
 Mustard (disambiguation)